Lunetta Savino (born 2 November 1957 in Bari) is an Italian theatre and movie actress, particularly famous for starring in popular TV series. She is best known in her home country for playing Cettina, one of the leading characters on Rai Uno's primetime TV series Un medico in famiglia. In 2010, she starred in Ferzan Özpetek's movie Loose Cannons, which received international acclaim.

Career
After graduating at Teatro "Alessandra Galante Garrone" in Bologna, Lunetta Savino made her stage debut in 1981 with Macbeth. Savino has enjoyed a successful stage career, performing in several plays including an Italian-language version of The Merchant of Venice (1984), Sorelle Materassi (from a novel by Aldo Palazzeschi, 1988), and Medea (1994). In 1995, she made her stage debut at Teatro dell'Orologio in Rome with Prova orale per membri esterni, a play by Claudio Grimaldi in which she starred as an oral sex instructor. The play proved to be extremely successful, being replicated for six seasons in many Italian cities.

In 1982, Savino made her screen debut, playing a small part in Grog, directed by Francesco Laudadio.

From 1998 to 2010, Savino played her breakthrough role. She starred as flamboyant au-pair girl from Southern Italy Cettina Gargiulo, a leading character in Un medico in famiglia, one of the most famous Italian TV-series of all times.

Savino has taken part in many TV series in her country, such as Il bello delle donne, Raccontami and Il figlio della luna.

In 2010, she starred as Stefania Cantone, a mother struggling with her grown-up son's sexual orientation, in Ferzan Özpetek's internationally acclaimed movie Loose Cannons

She briefly starred alongside Luciana Littizzetto in the TV series Fuoriclasse, playing the leading character's dishonest sister.

In 2015, Savino starred in Rai Uno's primetime TV series È arrivata la felicità, once again playing the role of a mother struggling with her child's homosexuality.

Personal life
Savino has a son, Antonio, born in 1988.

She supports the Italian centre-left party, and she once took part in a rally against former Italian prime minister Silvio Berlusconi.

While playing a homophobic mother twice on screen, Savino is a supporter of gay rights in Italy. She defines herself as a Catholic.

Selected filmography
 1981 - Grog, directed by Francesco Laudadio
 1983 - Juke Box
 1983 - Mi manda Picone, directed by Nanni Loy
 1985 - Chi mi aiuta?
 1997 - Terra di mezzo, directed by Matteo Garrone
 1998 - Marriages, directed by Cristina Comencini
 1998 - Cucciolo, directed by Neri Parenti
 1999 - Maschi e femmine
 2000 - Free the Fish (Liberate i pesci), directed by Cristina Comencini
 2001 - Se fossi in te, directed by Giulio Manfredonia
 2002 - W la scimmia, directed by Marco Colli
 2002 - Amore con la S maiuscola, directed by Paolo Costella
 2002 - Sono stato negro pure io, directed by Giulio Manfredonia
 2005 - Never Again as Before, directed by Giacomo Campiotti
 2007 - Saturn in Opposition, directed by Ferzan Özpetek
 2009 - Oggi sposi, directed by Luca Lucini
 2010 - Loose Cannons, directed by Ferzan Özpetek
 2011 - Bar Sport, directed by Massimo Martelli
 2012 - Tutto tutto niente niente, directed by Giulio Manfredonia
 2013 - Fiabeschi torna a casa, directed by Max Mazzotta
 2014 - Do You See Me?, directed by Riccardo Milani
 2015 - Io, Arlecchino, directed by Giorgio Pasotti
 2018 - Amici come prima, directed by Christian De Sica
 2019 - Rosa

References

External links
 

1957 births
20th-century Italian actresses
21st-century Italian actresses
Italian film actresses
Living people
Nastro d'Argento winners
People from Bari